The Battle of Mollet or the Action of Mollet took place at Mollet del Vallès, near Barcelona, in Catalonia, on 21 January 1810, between a force of 2,160 French soldiers commanded by General Guillaume Philibert Duhesme and a Spanish force of 3,000 men under Luis González Torres de Navarra, Marquess of Campoverde. The Spanish Division of Llobregat led by Campoverde intercepted and destroyed the French vanguard (500 men) at Santa Perpètua de Mogoda. Then, the Spanish marched to Mollet to face the rest of Duhesme forces (1,500 regulars, 160 cuirassiers and 2 cannons). The French were surrounded by the Spanish force and finally, after a vigorous defense, the French surrendered. The Spanish captured 500 French soldiers, 140 cuirassiers, 2 cannons, and the baggage. Duhesme and the rest of his force fled to Granollers, and were saved for other Spanish attack thanks to the arrival of Marshal Pierre Augereau with 9.000 men.

Notes

References

Further reading

External links
 

Battles of the Peninsular War
Battles of the Napoleonic Wars
Battles in Catalonia
Battles involving France
Battles involving Spain
Conflicts in 1810
January 1810 events